Oleksandr Nerush (born 17 January 1983) - is a Ukrainian professional basketball player for BC Budivelnyk of the UA SuperLeague.

External links
 FIBA Europe
 Oleksandr Nerush at basketball.eurobasket.com 

BC Budivelnyk players
Ukrainian men's basketball players
1983 births
Living people
BC Cherkaski Mavpy players
BC Dnipro-Azot players
Forwards (basketball)
Basketball players from Kyiv